This is a list of banks operating in Turkish Republic of Northern Cyprus..

All banks, including branches of foreign banks, private banks and International Banking Units are governed by the established Central Bank of Turkish Republic of Northern Cyprus. This organization audits and controls all these banks under international banking laws. All banks are compliant to strictly follow KYC and AML laws, are regulated by Ministry of Economy and Energy, and are supervised by the Central Bank.

International Banking Units (I.B.U.)
Fortress Bank
 Fortress Bank license has been revoked in 2021 

You can reach the official website of TRNC Central Bank 

http://www.mb.gov.ct.tr/sites/default/files/fortress%20Bank%20IBU%20Ltd.pdf

Public banks
Cyprus Vakiflar Bank

Private banks
Akfinans Bank  
Artam Bank
Asbank
Creditwest Bank  
Cyprus Turkish Cooperative Central Bank
Denizbank Ltd.  
Kıbrıs Continental Bank  
Kıbrıs İktisat Bankası 
Limassol Turkish Cooperative Bank  
Near East Bank
Şekerbank (Kıbrıs)  
Turkish Bank  
Universal Bank (TRNC)  
Viyabank  
Yeşilada Bank
Nova Bank

Branches of foreign banks
Garanti Bankası  
Halkbank  
Oyak Bank  
Türk Ekonomi Bankası  
Türkiye İş Bankası  
Ziraat Bankası

Development and investment banks
Development Bank of the TRNC

Banks under Savings Deposit Insurance Fund (S.D.I.F.)
Asia Bank
Cyprus Commercial Bank
Erbank
Industrial Bank of Kıbrıs
Rumeli Bank
Tilmo Bank
Yasa Bank

Defunct banks
Cyprus Commercial Bank - transferred to the SDIF in 2001
Cyprus Credit Bank - closed in 2000
Cyprus Eurobank
Cyprus Liberal Bank - closed in 2000
Everest Bank - closed in 2000
Finba Financial Bank - renamed Artam Bank in 2001
Hamza Bank - takeover by Seker Bank in 2002
Industrial Bank - transferred to the SDIF in 2002
Kıbrıs Finance Bank - closed in 2000
Kıbrıs Yurt Bank - closed in 2000
Med Bank - renamed Seker Bank in 2001
Mediterranean Guarantee Bank - transferred to Cyprus Vakıflar Bank on July 28, 2005

See also
Central Bank of the Turkish Republic of Northern Cyprus

References

Central Bank of the TRNC

Banks
Northern Cyprus
Northern Cyprus
+